The Indan is a club from Java.

Description 
The Indan is straight and has a twisted, elongated striking head. The handle is smooth and rounded at the pommel. A metal plate, which is worked out in the shape of a flower, serves as the end. The front end is finished with a kind of crown. The shape of the Indan goes back to a mythological weapon used by gods and heroes in Indonesian myths. The Indan is used by ethnic groups from Java.

References 

Weapons of Indonesia
Weapons of Java
Clubs (weapon)